Meir Eshel (December 26, 1964, Ashdod – October 10, 1993, Paris), known professionally as  Absalon, was an Israeli-French artist and sculptor.

Biography
Meir Eshel, the eldest of four children of Adèle and Elie Eshel, was born in December 1964 in the city of Ashdod. At the age fourteen he began to study at the Technical School of the Air Force in Haifa. After his graduation in 1982 he served as an aircraft technician at the Hatzerim Israeli Air Force Base for three years.

From 1985 to 1987, Absalon lived in Sinai and later in the dunes south of Ashdod, where he built a wooden cabin and made his living making jewelry. In an interview Absalon described the period:"I built my first house when I was 20: I was discharged from the army in a very bad state and went to the desert [...] for about a year I lived with the Bedouins in Sinai. I had a fantasy about life in the desert. I believed I could do it, until I realized it didn't fulfill me."

In 1987 he immigrated to Paris, and moved to the home of his uncle Jacques Ohayon which was located on Temple Street (Rue de Temple) in the Third Arrondissement of Paris. Eshel through Ohayon met several artists such as Christian Boltanski and Annette Messager. He began studying art at the École Nationale Supérieure d'Arts Paris-Cergy (ENSAPC) and attended the weekly Boltanski class at the École nationale supérieure des Beaux-Arts (ENSBA) during this period, he adopted the name "Absalon", a nickname given to him by one of his uncle's friends and referred to the biblical Absalon. In 1989 he received a one-year scholarship to study at the Institut des Hautes Études en Arts Plastiques in Paris. In 1990 he was represented by the Galerie Chantal Crousel. In the same year he was introduced to the curator Yona Fischer by Christian Boltanski, who invited him to exhibit in Israel at the Artists Studios, Aika Brown Gallery, Jerusalem, it was the first time he returned to Israel since moving to Paris. In 1991 Absalon moved to live in the Villa Lipchitz (Jacques Lipchitz) in Boulogne built by Le Corbusier in 1923–24. In 1993 Absalon planned to live in the six cells he designed for six cities, on October 10, 1993 Absalon died from an illness associated with HIV, at the age of 28.

The film "The seven years of Absalon" premiere, Created by & Script: David Ofek, Amit Azaz took place on May 29 at the Tel-Aviv Cinematheque. "The film describes Meir Eshel, a 22-year-old beach boy from Southern Israel, buys a one-way ticket to Paris and re-invents himself as an artist calling himself Absalon. He quickly rises to art-scene stardom, showcased by the most prestigious museums worldwide: the Venice Biennale, Centre Pompidou Paris, Tate Gallery London, and Israel Museum. Absalon's success was short-lived – almost seven years passed since his arrival in Paris until his tragic death, during the peak of his success at the age of 28. More than 25 years later, his younger brother Dani Eshel's first assignment as estate manager – is to sell Absalon's final art piece. Through his journey, we learn about the life of a unique Israeli artist." The film won the "Jury Award" at the Docaviv International Documentary Film Festival 2022. 

In May 2022, an official website containing the entire archive of Absalon art was launched by Absalon family.

Cells

In the course of six years Absalon created a series of one person living units based on everyday routine actions and designed entirely in relation to his measures. The inside of the cell is all covered in white in order to reduce distractions or elements that can disturb the eye. In his video Solutions (1992) Absalon demonstrate the study of measurements and calculation of movements like eating, sleeping, taking shower which later will define the form of his cells. In 1993 Absalon started to construct six cells which were supposed to be installed in six metropolitan centers as Absalon described in interview: "I would like to create my own setting and belong to nothing else. My living unit will be  the six habitation units which I construct, and my homeland will be in-between them."

Education
 1987– The École Nationale Supérieure d'Arts Paris-Cergy, Paris, France
 1987– The École Nationale Supérieure des Beaux-arts, Paris, France
 1988– The Institute des Hautes Études en Arts Plastiques (IHEAP), Paris, France

Videos
 1991– Proposals for Habitation (3:30min)
 1992– Solutions (7:25 min)
 1993– Noises (3:23 min)
 1993– Battle (62:24 min)
 1993– Mr. Leloup Life (31min)
 1993– Assassinations (33 min)

Solo exhibitions
 1989– Centre d'Art Contemporain d'Ivry (CREDAC), Ivry-sur-Seine, France (catalogue) 
 1990–"Proposals for Habitation (Scale 1:1)," Artists Studio, Aika Brown Gallery, Jerusalem (catalogue) 
 1990-Musée Sainte-Croix, Poitiers, France (catalogue)
 1990–"Cells," Galerie Crousel-Robelin / Bama, Paris 
 1991– "Compartments," Kunstlerhaus, Stuttgart
 1991– "Compartments" Kulturbehrde, Hamburg
 1991– "Compartments," Galerie Crousel-Robelin / Bama, Paris 
 1992– Tel Aviv Museum of Art, Tel Aviv (catalogue) 
 1992– Galerie Etienne Ficheroulle, Brussels 
 1992– "A Universe without Objects," FNAC, Hôtel des Arts, Paris 
 1992– Kaye Pesblum Gallery, Helsinki 
 1993– "Cells," Musée d'Art Moderne de la Ville de Paris (catalogue) 
 1993– "Battle," Galerie Crousel-Robelin / Bama and Jean-René Fleurieu, Paris 
 1993– Carmelitenkloster, Frankfurt
 1993– Galerie Luis Campana, Cologne
 1994– Galerie Crousel-Robelin / Bama, Paris
 1994–  "Cells," Tretyakov Gallery, Moscow
 1994– De Appel, Amsterdam (catalogue) 
 1994– Carré d'Art, Musée d'Art Contemporain, Nîmes, France (catalogue)
 1994– "Noises," Chisenhale Gallery, London 
 1994– "Disposition," Château d'Aulteribe, Sermentizon, France 
 1994– Attitudes Gallery, Geneva 
 1995– "Cells," Chisenhale Gallery, London 
 1995– "Cells," Kunstverein, Hamburg
 1996– "Cells," Douglas Hyde Gallery, Dublin
 1996– "Absalon: Complete Video Works," Oriel Gallery, Cardiff 
 1997– Galerie Chantal Crousel, Paris 
 1997– L’Institut d ‘Art et Techniques de Bretagne Occidentale (IATBO), Brest, France 1997– Kunsthalle Zurich 
 1999– "Cells, Models & Drawings," Goldie Paley Gallery at Moore College, Philadelphia (catalogue)
 2005– Platform Garanti, Istanbul
 2005– "The Intruders," off-site program, Pavillon de l’Arsenal, Musée de la Ville de Paris
 2005– Les Visiteurs programme, Chartreuse de Villeneuve-lès-Avignon, France 
 2006– "Battle," Ballet Preljocaj, opening of the Pavillon Noir, Centre Choréographique National, Aix en-Provence 
 2007– "Marie-Ange Guilleminot présente Absalon," La Chappelle de Visitandines, Amiens 
 2008– Passerelle Centre d’Art, Brest, France
 2010– KW Institute for Contemporary Art, Berlin (catalogue)
 2012– Museum Boijmans Van Beuningen, Rotterdam (catalogue)
 2013– Tel Aviv Museum of Art, Tel Aviv (catalogue)

Selected group exhibitions
 1988– Atelier du Parvis de Beaubourg, Centre Georges Pompidou, Paris 
 1989 – "Pas à côté pas n'importe où (Not a side, not anywhere)," Villa Arson, Nice 
 1989 – "Carte blanche à Jean de Loisy (Free card for Jean de Loisy)," Centre d'Art Contemporain d'Ivry (CREDAC), Ivry-sur-Seine
 1990 – "Resistance: Absalon, Art in Ruins, Véronique Joumard, Serge Kliaving," Musée Sainte-Croix, Poitiers (catalogue)
 1990  "Lignes de mire 1 (Lines of Sight)," Fondation Cartier, Jouy-en-Josas, France
 1990– "Le Cinq (the Five)," Tramway, Glasgow; curator: Jean de Loisy (catalogue)
 1990 – "VII Ateliers Internationaux des Pays de Loire" Fonds Régional d’Art Contemporain (FRAC); curator: Jean-François Taddei (catalogue; text: Hans-Ulrich Obrist) 
 1991 – "Collection of the CAPC Museum," Musée d’Art Contemporain (CAPC), Bordeaux 
 1991– "Movements 1 & 2," Centre Georges Pompidou, Paris; curator: Jean-Pierre Bordaz (catalogue) 
 1992 – Documenta 9, Kassel; curator: Jan Hoet (catalogue) 
 1992– "New Acquisitions," Caisse des Dépôts et Consignations, Paris 
 1992– Third International Istanbul Biennale; curator: Vasif Kortun 
 1993 – "L’Image dans le tapis (The Image in the Carpet)," Arsenale, Venice Biennale; curator: Jean de Loisy (catalogue) 
 1993– "Hôtel Carlton Palace, Chambre 763," 207 boulevard Raspail, Paris; curator: Hans-Ulrich Obrist 
 1993– "Lieux de la vie moderne (Places of Modern Life)," Le Quartier 
 1993– Centre d’Art Contemporain, Quimper, France 
 1993– "Le milieu du monde (The Middle of the World)," Villa Saint
 1994 – "Hors limites (Out of Bounds)," Musée National d’Art Moderne, Centre Georges Pompidou, Paris; curator: Jean de Loisy (catalogue) 
 1994– "Même si c’est la nuit (Even if it is Night)," Musée d’Art Contemporain (CAPC), Bordeaux; curator: Jean-Louis Froment 
 1994– "Le saut dans le vide (A Leap into the Void)," Artists House, Moscow (catalogue) 
 1994– "Beats," Collection de la Caisse des Dépôts et Consignations, Belém Cultural Centre, Lisbon 
 1994– "Un papillon sur la roue (A Butterfly on a Wheel)," Espace d’Art Moderne et Contemporain, Toulouse 
 1995 – "Rudiments d’un musée possible 2 (Rudiments for a Possible Museum 2)," Musée d’Art Moderne et Contemporain (MAMCO), Geneva
 1995 – "Currents ‘95: Familiar Places," Institute of Contemporary Art (ICA), Boston 
 1995– "Artistes/Architectes (Artists/ Architects)," Le Nouveau Musée, Villeurbanne, France
 1995 – "Architecture(s)," Musée d’art contemporain (CAPC), Bordeaux 
 1995– "Insomnie (Insomnia)," Centre d’Art Contemporain, Domaine de Kerguehennec, Bretagne 
 1996– "Decadent Future: Art and Architecture," Centre for Visual Arts, Cardiff 
 1996– "Vision and Reality," Louisiana Museum of Modern Art, Humlebaek, Denmark 
 1996– "House, Body, Identity: Construction of Identities," Museum Moderner Kunst Stiftung Ludwig (MUMOK), Vienna; National Gallery, Prague 
 2004– "Contrepoint (Counterpoint)," Louvre Museum, Paris
 2004– "Living Inside the Grid," New Museum of Contemporary Art, New York 
 2005 – "Yona in Bezalel," Bezalel Gallery,  Tel Aviv; curators: Sarit Shapira, Sandra Weil (catalogue) 
 2006 – "Au delà des images (Beyond Images)," Galerie Sfeir-Semler, Beirut 
 2006– "Sip my Ocean," Louisiana Museum of Modern Art, Humlebaek, Denmark 
 2007– "The Unhomely," 2nd International Biennial of Contemporary Art, Seville 
 2007-- "Volksgarten: Politics of Belonging," Kunsthaus Graz, Austria 
 2009 – "Die Kunst Ist Super! (Art Is Super!)," Hamburger Bahnhof Museum, Berlin
 2021- "ABSALON ABSALON" CAPC musée d'art contemporain de Bordeaux, France

Collections
 Centre Georges Pompidou, Paris 
 Musée d’Art Moderne de la Ville de Paris (ARC)
 Centre National des Arts Plastiques (CNAP), Paris
 Fond Régional d’Art Contemporain (FRAC) Languedoc-Roussillon, Montpellier
 Fond Régional d’Art Contemporain (FRAC) Aquitaine, Bordeaux
 Musée d’Art Contemporain (CAPC), Bordeaux
 Musée d’Art Contemporain (MAC), Marseilles
 Musée d’Art Moderne de Saint-étienne
 Carré d’Art, Nîmes, France
 Centre Régional d’Art Contemporain, Grenoble, France
 La Collection de la Caisse des Dépôts et Consignations, Paris
 Tate Gallery, London
 Friedrich Christian Flick Collection at Hamburger Bahnhof, Berlin
 Louisiana Museum of Modern Art, Humlebaek, Denmark
 Magasin 3 Stockholm Konsthall
 Malmö Konsthall, Sweden
 Kunstmuseum Liechtenstein, Vaduz
 Institute of Contemporary Art (ICA), Boston
 The Israel Museum, Jerusalem
 Tel Aviv Museum of Art

References

1964 births
1993 deaths
People from Ashdod
20th-century Israeli male artists
20th-century Israeli sculptors
Israeli emigrants to France
AIDS-related deaths in France